Villa López   is a town and seat of the municipality of López, in the northern Mexican state of Chihuahua. As of 2010, the town had a population of 2,184, up from 2,066 as of 2005.

It was given its official modern name Octaviano López after the Mexican army captain, Octaviano López. Upon its foundation in 1619 it was originally called Atotonilco.

References

Populated places in Chihuahua (state)